Dieter Salomon (born 9 August 1960 in Melbourne, Australia) is a German politician of Alliance '90/The Greens who served as mayor of Freiburg im Breisgau for two terms from 2002 until 2018.

Biography
Salomon grew up in the German Allgäu. He received his Abitur in 1979 in Oberstdorf, and moved to Freiburg to study Political Science, Public Finance, and Roman Philology. He received a Doctor of Philosophy degree from the University of Freiburg in 1991. During his time as a student, he became active in the local chapter of the Alliance 90/The Greens.

Salomon was married to Helen Hall-Salomon, and has one child from a previous marriage. Since 2011, he lived separated from his wife. At the end of 2015, he married his new partner in Melbourne, Helga Mayer.

Political career
From 1990 until 2000, Salomon was a member of Freiburg city council, and was a member of the Landtag of Baden-Württemberg from 1992. From April 2002, he was the head of the Baden-Württemberg Green Party fraction, and lead candidate for state elections.

Salomon became mayor of Freiburg on 1 July 2002, after receiving 64.4% of votes on the second ballot held on 5 May 2002, thereby becoming the first Green mayor of a large German city, and only the second or third in the whole of Germany. Once elected mayor of Freiburg, he resigned his position in the Landtag. Within the Green Party, he is considered a Realo.

Salomon was defeated in the mayoral election of 6 May 2018 by surprise winner Martin Horn. 
The second round voting result was Martin Horn 44,3% - Dieter Salomon 30,7%.
Martin Horn won by the 2nd round simple majority rule.

In a post declaration interview with the media Salomon announced his retirement from politics.

Salomon served as a Green Party delegate to the Federal Convention for the purpose of electing the President of Germany in 2012.

Other activities

Corporate boards
 Abfallwirtschaft und Stadtreinigung Freiburg (ASF), Ex-Officio Chairman of the Supervisory Board (2002-2018)
 Badenova, Ex-Officio Chairman of the Supervisory Board (2002-2018)
 Freiburger Stadtbau (FSB), Ex-Officio Chairman of the Supervisory Board (2002-2018)
 L-Bank, Member of the Supervisory Board (2002-2018)
 LBBW Immobilien, Member of the Supervisory Board
 Messe Freiburg, Ex-Officio Chairman of the Supervisory Board (2002-2018)

Non-profit organizations
 Grüner Wirtschaftsdialog, Member of the Advisory Board (since 2021)
 Association of German Cities, Deputy Member of the Presidium (2004-2018)	
 Max Planck Institute for Foreign and International Criminal Law, Member of the Board of Trustees
 Max Planck Institute of Immunobiology and Epigenetics, Member of the Board of Trustees
 University of Freiburg, Member of the Advisory Board

Written Works

References

External links

Personal website (offline)
Dieter wählen - personal mayoral election website (offline)

1960 births
Living people
Mayors of Freiburg
Australian people of German-Jewish descent
Australian emigrants to Germany
Alliance 90/The Greens politicians
Members of the Landtag of Baden-Württemberg
People from Melbourne
University of Freiburg alumni